Lac-Cabasta is an unorganized territory in the Lanaudière region of Quebec, Canada, part of the Matawinie Regional County Municipality.

See also
List of unorganized territories in Quebec

References

Unorganized territories in Lanaudière
Matawinie Regional County Municipality